Wilde Aa (in its lower course also: Aar) is a river of North Rhine-Westphalia and Hesse, Germany. It flows into the Orke near Lichtenfels.

See also
List of rivers of Hesse
List of rivers of North Rhine-Westphalia

References

Rivers of Hesse
Rivers of North Rhine-Westphalia
Rivers of Germany